Idalia is a national park in South West Queensland, Australia, 893 km west of Brisbane. Idalia National Park is located near the town of Blackall in the Queensland outback.  The park protects 144,000 hectares of mulga lands with conservation value. Idalia National Park was opened in 1990 by Prince Philip.

The national park is home to many distinctly Australian species of flora and fauna, including wallaroos, red and grey kangaroos, swamp wallabies, black-striped wallabies, yellow-footed rock-wallabies and endangered bridled nailtail wallabies. Contained within the park are a number of Aboriginal heritage sites, including artefact scatters, stone arrangements and camp sites. Also found in the park are the ruins of two historic homesteads; Idalia and Collabara.

Facilities
There is no accommodation available onsite however camping is allowed at designated sites.

Access
Access to the park is only available via four-wheel drive. In times of heavy rainfall access into and out of the park is not possible.

Fact sheet
Area: 1440.00 km²
Coordinates: 
Date of establishment: 1990
Managing authorities: Queensland Parks and Wildlife Service
IUCN category: II

See also

 Protected areas of Queensland

References

National parks of Queensland
Protected areas established in 1990
1990 establishments in Australia
South West Queensland